The Livestock Assistance Program (LAP) is an emergency livestock assistance periodically authorized and funded by Congress in response to natural disasters.

The pre-2005 version of LAP provides direct payments to eligible livestock producers who suffered grazing losses due to natural disasters during either calendar year 2001 or 2002 (not both).  For an individual producer to be eligible, the producer’s county must have suffered a minimum 40% loss of available grazing for at least 3 consecutive months due to a disaster during the year. The county also had to be declared a disaster area by either the President or the Secretary of Agriculture in 2001 or 2002.  Once the county qualified for assistance, a producer had to suffer a minimum loss of 40% in order to qualify for a payment to partially compensate for purchases of off-farm feed.  Producers with more than $2.5 million of gross revenue are ineligible.  The maximum payment is $40,000 per person.

External links
https://web.archive.org/web/20050109045813/http://www.fsa.usda.gov/pas/publications/facts/html/lap01.htm

United States federal agriculture legislation